The 1836 Delaware gubernatorial election was held on November 8, 1836. Democratic Governor Caleb P. Bennett, elected in 1832, died in office on May 9, 1836, and was succeeded by State Senate Speaker (and former Governor) Charles Polk Jr., a Whig. Former State House Speaker and State Treasurer Cornelius P. Comegys ran as the Whig nominee to succeed Polk, and faced Democratic nominee Nehemiah Clark in the general election. Continuing the streak of closely fought elections, Comegys narrowly defeated Clark, winning 52% of the vote to Clark's 48%.

General election

Results

References

Bibliography
 
 
 

1836
Delaware
Gubernatorial